The Besano Formation is a geological formation in the southern Alps of northwestern Italy and southern Switzerland. This formation, a short but fossiliferous succession of dolomite and black shale, is famous for its preservation of Middle Triassic marine life including fish and aquatic reptiles. It is exposed in the vicinity of Monte San Giorgio and is among the formations responsible for the area being designated as a UNESCO World Heritage Site. In Switzerland, it is also known as the Grenzbitumenzone.

Geology

General geology 
The Grenzbitumenzone is a relatively thin band of dark dolomite and shale, approximately 5 to 16 meters in total thickness. It extends about 10 km from east to west along the northern edge of Monte San Giorgio. In individual outcrops, the Grenzbitumenzone overlies the lower part of San Salvatore Dolomite, a thick and widespread carbonate-rich formation. The later parts of the San Salvatore Formation, exposed north of Monte San Giorgio, are partially isochronous with the Grenzbitumenzone (formed at the same time). At its upper extent, the Grenzbitumenzone grades into the San Giorgio Dolomite, a formation with fewer fossils and a lower concentration of organic matter. The San Giorgio Dolomite itself is succeeded by the fossil-rich Meride Limestone.

As its name indicates, the sediments of the Grenzbitumenzone are bituminous, rich in organic matter to the point that they burn readily. Grey laminated (finely-layered) dolomite with about 20% organic matter comprises the majority of the formation. The width of laminae in these dolomite layers vary widely from sub-millimeter to sub-centimeter scales, as a function of mineral or grain size variation. Invertebrate fossils and isolated quartz grains are common in the dolomite, while vertebrates and radiolarian molds are preserved less often. Finely-laminated black shale with up to 40% organic matter makes up a smaller portion. Radiolarians and vertebrate fossils are common in the shale. However, invertebrates are practically absent, and crystals of dolomite and detrital quartz are rare. These major dolomite or shale layers show very little evidence of bioturbation or disturbance. Pyrite is present but uncommon, likely a consequence of low iron availability. The organic matter can be characterized as type II kerogen, enriched in hopane and porphyrin compounds, though strongly depleted in Carbon-13. These biomarkers, when combined, indicate that most of the organic material was derived from cyanobacteria.

Other sediments and rock types are uncommon in the formation. Thin layers of fine-grained laminated dolomite with a white color extend over a wide area. They have very little organic matter and instead contain shell fragments and peloids. This white dolomite likely represents distal turbidite deposits, collapsed from nearby carbonate sources. A similar origin is inferred for massive (unbedded) dolomite layers, which have a porous texture and heterogenous grain sizes. There is some evidence of reworking, as thin dolomite layers rarely show wavy layering or are ripped up into clasts by deep currents. The black shale layers occasionally preserve bands of chert, derived from radiolarian blooms. Numerous narrow bentonite layers (volcanic tuffs) occur throughout the formation. They are mostly composed of illite and montmorillonite, with occasional crystals of sanidine. Unlike most Triassic tuffs from the Southern Alps, plagioclase crystals are completely absent.

Palaeoenvironment 
The formation is representative of a small intraplatform basin, a deep and stable marine environment which would have been positioned among shallow-water reefs and carbonate platforms. The carbonate platforms themselves are preserved in thick sequences, such as the San Salvatore Dolomite further north and west, and the Esino Limestone further east. The Grenzbitumenzone basin may be up to 20 km wide, if the Perledo-Varenna Formation east of Lake Como also belongs to the basin. This system of carbonate platforms and basins developed along a western tongue of the Tethys Ocean, which transgressed eastwards during the Middle Triassic.

Alternations between dolomite and shale in the Grenzbitumenzone are probably a consequence of sea level fluctuations. Raised sea levels would have submerged the carbonate platforms, which may have enhanced dolomite deposition in the basin. Alternatively, it would have connected the basin to other nutrient-rich areas, leading to phytoplankton blooms and thus more shale deposition. Laminations within dolomite layers correspond to fluctuating carbonate levels, possibly linked to runoff from carbonate platforms during storms.

The sediments of the Grenzbitumenzone are undisturbed by benthic (seabed-living) organisms, while well-preserved fossils, organic matter, and heavy metal ions are prevalent. This evidence supports the traditional view that the seabed of the basin was completely anoxic – stagnant, oxygen-deprived, and lifeless. However, abundant fossils of nektonic (swimming) and planktonic (free-floating) life indicate that oxygen was more concentrated in seawater closer to the surface. There has been debate over the origin or intensity of this strong stratification in oxygen content. The basin, though relatively deep, was likely too shallow for stratification via deep saline currents or a strong temperature gradient. The traditional view places blame on a concentration of planktonic bacteria at mid-level in the water column, dividing an oxic upper part of the basin from the anoxic lower part. There is little evidence for microbial activity on the seabed during the deposition of the Grenzbitumenzone.

Later studies have argued that the seabed could have been dysoxic – with low oxygen levels, though still greater than in anoxic waters. Among the most common fossils belong to Daonella, a bivalve with strong debate over its habitat preferences. Early studies argued that it was pseudoplanktonic (attached to floating objects) or washed in from shallower areas, congruent with an anoxic Grenzbitumenzone seabed. However, Daonella is now believed to have lived in place at the bottom of the basin, specializing in a dysoxic environment inhospitable to most other benthic animals. Disarticulation and reorientation of Grenzbitumenzone fossils have favored the presence of weak and oxygenated bottom currents. Early evidence for bottom currents was controversial and perhaps based on a misdrawn illustration, but further specimen sampling supports the same general conclusion.

Taphonomy 
Grenzbitumenzone fossils are usually well-preserved, but most are compressed between sediment layers. Compaction is much more pronounced in the thin shale layers than the thicker dolomite layers. Soft tissue preservation is rare but not unheard of: it includes calcified shark cartilage, phosphatized coprolites and gut contents, and organic remnants of reptile scales. In a dysoxic environment, preservation may have been facilitated by bacterial mats, adhering and sealing a skeleton onto the substrate. However, direct evidence for bacterial mats is not present.

Two ways to quantify a skeleton’s preservation are completeness (the proportion of a skeleton present in a fossil) and articulation (the proportion of a skeleton preserved in life position). The completeness and articulation of Serpianosaurus fossils are variable, though are fairly high on average. The two factors are most clearly linked in the head, a heavy part of the skeleton which is most likely to sink first, detaching from the rest of a floating body. Even so, headless and relatively incomplete specimens are rare, so bodies are unlikely to fall apart while floating for an extended period. The vertebrae and ribs tend to be disarticulated, though only over a short distance. Peripheral elements such as the toes are also prone to disarticulation. Disarticulation is probably a result of subtle deep-water currents, during a long period of slow decay on the seabed. Heads and tails tend to curve in the same direction, which may be a consequence of current flow.

Saurichthys fossils of the Grenzbitumenzone are often well-preserved, though disarticulated and twisted specimens are more common than in the Cassina beds of the Meride Limestone. This may be due to the low sedimentation rate of the Grenzbitumenzone relative to the Meride Limestone, providing more time for the influence of bottom currents prior to burial. The Cassina beds also have more direct evidence for microbial mats, which could have played a role in stabilizing decaying carcasses.

Conversely, ichthyosaur fossils of the Grenzbitumenzone tend to have higher completeness than those found in Early Jurassic formations elsewhere in Europe. There is no specific region of the body with significantly lower completeness, arguing that the fossils were unaffected by preferential scavenging. Fossil completeness may have been enhanced by the relatively small and isolated nature of the Grenzbitumenzone basin, protected from the influence of stronger marine currents.

Paleobiota 
The formation is highly fossiliferous and has provided the following fossils:

Reptiles

Bony fish

Cartilaginous fish

Invertebrates 
 Ammonoids (Celtites, Protrachyceras, Serpianites, Ticinites, Repossia, Flexoptychites, Proarcestes, Stoppaniceras, Parakellnerites, etc.)
Belemnoids (Breviconoteuthis, Phragmoteuthis, Mojsisovicsteuthis, etc.)
Bivalves (Daonella, Peribositria, etc.)
Conodonts (Gondolella, etc.)
Crustaceans (Antrimpos)
Gastropods (Frederikella, Worthenia, Trachynerita, Omphaloptycha, etc.)
Nautiloids (Michelinoceras, etc.)

Plants 

 Calcareous algae (Diplopora)
 Voltzialean conifers (Voltzia)

References

Further reading 
 A. López Arbarello, T. Bürgin, H. Furrer and R. Stockar. 2019. Taxonomy and phylogeny of Eosemionotus Stolley, 1920 (Neopterygii: Ginglymodi) from the Middle Triassic of Europe. Palaeontologia Electronica 22(1.10A):1-64
 O. Rieppel. 1981. The Hybodontiform Sharks from the Middle Triassic of Mte. San Giorgio, Switzerland. Neues Jahrbuch für Geologie und Paläontologie, Abhandlungen 161:324-353
 H. Rieber. 1973. Die Triasfauna der Tessiner Kalkalpen: XXII. Cephalopoden aus der Grenzbitumenzone (Mittlere Trias) des Monte San Giorgio (Kanton Tessin, Schweiz). Schweizerische Palaeontologische Abhandlungen 93:1-96
  B. Krebs., E. Kuhn-Schnyder und B. Peyer 1965 Die Triasfauna der Tessiner Kalkalpen. XIX. Ticinosuchus ferox nov. gen. nov. sp. [E. Kuhn-Schnyder and B. Peyer: The Triassic fauna of the Ticino Limestone Alps. XIX. Ticinosuchus ferox nov. gen. nov. sp.]. Schweizerische Paläontologische Abhandlungen, Memoires suisses de Paleontologie 81:1-140 
 E. Kuhn-Schnyder. 1962. Ein weiterer Schädel von Macrocnemus bassanii Nopcsa aus der anisischen Stufe der Trias des Monte San Giorgio (Kt. Tessin, Schweiz). Paläontologische Zeitschrift 36:110-133
 J. Brough. 1939. The Triassic fishes of Besano, Lombardy 1-117

Geologic formations of Italy
Geologic formations of Switzerland
Triassic System of Europe
Anisian Stage
Ladinian Stage
Dolomite formations
Shale formations
Lagoonal deposits
Shallow marine deposits
Fossiliferous stratigraphic units of Europe
Paleontology in Italy
Paleontology in Switzerland
Geology of the Alps
Limestone Alps